Jure Travner (born 28 September 1985) is a Slovenian football defender who plays for Mura.

Career
Travner began his professional playing career with Celje in 2004.

On 18 July 2009, Travner signed for Watford for an undisclosed fee on a two-year deal. Although considered a member of the first team squad, Travner failed to make an appearance for Watford in 2009–10.

It was announced on 9 July 2010 that Travner would join St Mirren on a year-long loan. He scored his first St Mirren goal in the final minute against Aberdeen on 30 October to give the Saints a 2–1 win. Travner was released by Watford in January 2011, but then signed a contract to the end of the 2010–11 season with St Mirren.

Travner was out of contract with St Mirren when he was signed by Bulgarian A PFG side Ludogorets Razgrad on 19 August 2011. On 31 October he made his league debut for Ludogorets, in their 3–0 win over Montana.

In July 2013 Travner agreed to join Azerbaijan Premier League side FK Baku.

Near the end of 2014, Travner joined English Championship side Reading on trial, playing in several behind closed doors friendlies for the club. On 22 January 2015 he signed for Reading on a short team contract until the end of the 2014–15 season, making his debut on 14 March in a 4–1 defeat to former club Watford. Travner was released by Reading on 21 May 2015, and was then re-signed by Celje in July 2015.

Career statistics

Honours
Celje
Slovenian PrvaLiga: 2019–20

Mura
Slovenian PrvaLiga: 2020–21

References

External links
PrvaLiga profile 

1985 births
Living people
Sportspeople from Celje
Slovenian footballers
Slovenia under-21 international footballers
Association football defenders
NK Celje players
NK Šmartno ob Paki players
NK Dravograd players
Slovenian PrvaLiga players
Slovenian Second League players
Slovenian expatriate footballers
Expatriate footballers in England
Watford F.C. players
Expatriate footballers in Scotland
St Mirren F.C. players
Expatriate footballers in Bulgaria
PFC Ludogorets Razgrad players
ND Mura 05 players
Scottish Premier League players
First Professional Football League (Bulgaria) players
Reading F.C. players
English Football League players
Azerbaijan Premier League players
Slovenian expatriate sportspeople in England
Slovenian expatriate sportspeople in the United Kingdom
Slovenian expatriate sportspeople in Bulgaria
Expatriate footballers in Azerbaijan
Slovenian expatriate sportspeople in Azerbaijan
FC Baku players
NŠ Mura players